Alvin Crockett (October 19, 1831 – July 9, 1902) was the first mayor of Logan, Utah and later served for 15 years as sheriff of Cache County, Utah.

Crockett was born on the Fox Islands of Maine. His family joined the Church of Jesus Christ of Latter-day Saints while he was a young child and later emigrated to Nauvoo and then Utah.  He settled in Payson, Utah shortly after his marriage in 1851.  He moved to Logan, Utah in 1861.  He was a member of the Cache Stake High Council of The Church of Jesus Christ of Latter-day Saints from 1863 until at least 1901.

Sources
Andrew Jenson. LDS Biographical Encyclopedia. Vol. 1, p. 418-419.

1831 births
1902 deaths
People from Vinalhaven, Maine
Latter Day Saints from Maine
People from Payson, Utah
Politicians from Logan, Utah
Mayors of places in Utah
Latter Day Saints from Utah